André Ungar (July 21, 1929 – May 5, 2020) was a Hungarian-born doctor of philosophy, liturgist, social activist, and rabbi who lived in England, South Africa and the United States. In 1956, South Africa ordered him to leave on account of his decrying of apartheid. Rabbi Ungar was the author of Living Judaism (Reform Synagogue of Great Britain: 1958), and Judaism for Our Time (RSGB: 1973); and various articles on the subject of Jewish philosophy. His alternative, poetic translations of the Amidah have appeared in all editions and versions of Siddur Sim Shalom, of the Conservative Jewish denomination.

References

1929 births
2020 deaths
Hungarian Jews
Hungarian philosophers
Jewish philosophers